Ommatoiulus moreleti (spelt moreletii in older publications), commonly known as the Portuguese millipede, is a herbivorous millipede native to the western Iberian Peninsula where it shares its range with other Ommatoiulus species. From here, it has spread by international commerce to a number of new localities.  This species was accidentally introduced into Australia without its natural enemies and has since become an invasive pest. A number of methods have been developed to manage this millipede.

Distribution

O. moreleti is indigenous to the western Iberian Peninsula. It has spread to a number of Atlantic islands (Macaronesia and Bermuda), South Africa and Australia. This distribution appears to be related to 20th century shipping routes. Spread of O. moreleti by international trade may be facilitated by its ability to survive long sea voyages in a quiescent state.  This species survives long, dry summers in a quiescent state in its natural habitat. After its initial introduction to South Australia in about 1953 (perhaps originating from ships’ ballast) the species is continuing to spread through southern Australia.  It is possible that there has been more than one introduction to Australia. 
Since being introduced to Port Lincoln, South Australia in 1953, the millipede has spread to other parts of South Australia, Victoria,  Tasmania, Australian Capital Territory, southern New South Wales and  Western Australia around Perth.

Life cycle

Reproductive females mature their eggs during late summer-early autumn and may be seen mating during the autumnal activity period after which the female lays 60-80 eggs in a chamber 1–2 cm deep in the soil.
The egg hatches to a pupoid stage, then develops by a series of moults up to 16 stages over 3 years. Males can be differentiated by the 8th and 12th stages but most are mature by the 10th or 11th stages. Females probably mature at similar stages. One-year-old immatures (stages 7–9) are light brown with a darker medial stripe. After 2 years the 10-11 stage millipedes have turned black. Millipedes older than 1 year moult only in spring and summer. Adult males are periodomorphic, alternating between a sexual and a non-sexual form. In their sexual form, they have gonopods (mating legs) in the seventh body segment, which they lose when they moult in spring. They remain in the non-sexual "eunuch" form until their late summer moult.

Activity

The main period of O. moreleti activity follows the breaking of summer drought by autumnal rains and cooling temperatures. During autumn and early winter, millipedes are active on the surface and may be observed mating.  A temperature range 17-21 °C and humidity of around 95% favour activity.  These conditions characteristically occur at night. Under similar conditions, individual females on laboratory treadmills move up to 50 metres per day. During winter, there is little surface activity but during spring there is an increase in surface activity. With increasing summer temperatures, O. moreleti aggregates in humid habitats.  At temperatures around 27 °C, millipedes become quiescent.

Habitat
In the southern Iberian Peninsula, a number of species of the genus Ommatoiulus share a similar range but divide their habitat on type of litter.  This close species packing suggests habitat partitioning may operate to limit numbers of  O. moreleti in relation to other Ommatoiulus species.  O. moreleti prefers tree litter, particularly Quercus spp. (densities stage 7 or older O. moreleti  of about 5 per m²)  and Pinus spp. whereas O. moreleti  is replaced by other species in shrub litter or grasslands  By contrast, in southern Australia, grassland densities (stage 7 or older) of O. moreleti of over 40 per m².

As an invading species in the southern Australian detritivore community, O. moreleti does not appear to have negatively affected native millipedes sharing a similar range, and seems to have occupied vacant niches.

Food
Gut contents of mature O. moreleti collected in Portugal were predominantly fragments of Quercus and Pinus litter. However, guts also contained significant amounts of fresh mosses and liverworts.  O. moreleti  can be raised in culture from egg to reproductive stage by feeding solely on fresh mosses.

Natural enemies
Natural enemies in Portugal include the European hedgehog (Erinaceus europaeus) and  the beetle Ocypus olens, both of which are generalist predators.   A number of parasites have also been identified.  None of the natural enemies found in Portugal occur in Australia.

In many parts of South Australia, densities of O. moreleti have declined markedly from a peak period during the 1970s to relatively low densities during mid 1980 to the present.  This decline has been associated with parasitism by the nematode Rhabditis necromena  that appears to have spread from native millipede populations.  This nematode has been actively spread throughout O. moreleti populations in South Australia by government and private operators.  Infection can be detected by crushing a millipede in saline in a petri dish and examining under a X20 dissecting microscope.

Human interactions
In urban areas of southern Australia, O. moreleti enter dwellings during their autumn and spring activity periods. As a defense mechanism, the millipede secretes a pungent yellowish fluid containing quinones. This stains clothes permanently and irritates eyes. Due to this defence it is best for people to sweep them up rather than crushing them.

In South Australia during the 1970s when O. moreleti were dense in the immediate house surrounds, householders were sweeping volumes of up to several litres from their houses each morning. O. moreleti, alone of the millipede species in this environment, are attracted to low intensity light, of the type emitted from houses at night.  Householders in South Australia have used chemical or physical barriers to prevent millipedes from entering houses.  Recently, population suppression by spreading the nematode Rhabditis necromena appears to have effectively reduced millipede populations below worry thresholds over large areas of urban and semi-rural South Australia.

In southern Australia O. moreleti is reported as damaging  seedlings of brassica and cereal crops and  soft, ripe fruits such as strawberries.  Millipedes sheltering in bunches of wine grapes at harvest (autumn) may taint wine.

Masses of O. moreleti on railway lines during their activity periods are reported as causing slippage of locomotives in South Australia, Victoria and Western Australia, causing train cancellations due to the disturbance of signalling equipment. Crushed millipedes may have caused a 2013 minor train crash in Clarkson, Western Australia.  Millipedes on the tracks appear to have affected the train's deceleration.
In Adelaide, suburban trains are fitted with brushes before the front wheels to clear the line of millipedes.

References

Julida
Millipedes of Europe
Fauna of Portugal
Endemic insects of the Iberian Peninsula
Animals described in 1860